The 1939 Western Illinois Leathernecks football team represented Western Illinois University as a member of the Illinois Intercollegiate Athletic Conference (IIAC) during the 1939 college football season. They were led by 14th-year head coach Ray Hanson and played their home games at Morgan Field. The Leathernecks finished the season with a 5–1–1 record overall and a 3–0–1 record in conference play, winning the IIAC title.

Schedule

References

Western Illinois
Western Illinois Leathernecks football seasons
Interstate Intercollegiate Athletic Conference football champion seasons
Western Illinois Leathernecks football